Nettleton Mill is a mill house in Wiltshire, England, on the banks of the Bybrook River, to the southeast of Nettleton. Part of the Castle Combe estate, it was built in 1774 as a farmhouse; this date is inscribed on the outer building.  The old ruined farmhouse was refurbished in the early 1990s and has been converted into a bed and breakfast cottage.

Geography
The bridge at Fosse Way over Broadmead Brook is nearby, where signal and native crayfish have been recorded by use of traps. The stream that flows through the property is known for trout fishing.

History
Milling operations at the Nettleton Mill were discontinued sometime before World War I. In the 1950s and 60s, the turbine power was utilised, probably when the stream flow became inadequate. Between 1984 and 1986, the site was a shooting location for the 1980s cult series Robin of Sherwood.

After the farmhouse was vacated by Connolly Leather Ltd in 1991, the Museum of London evaluated the heritage status of this 18th century building from an archaeological perspective to enable the town Planning Department to register it as a Grade II Listed building. It is now run as a country retreat.

Features
The structure is built of local stone. The undershot wheel of the grist mill was replaced by a turbine during the 19th century. The sheds in the annex of the farmhouse were used for storage of farm products. The layout of the building at ground-floor level consists of a large, high-vaulted drawing room. A conservatory passage leads to the kitchen and dining space. On the next floor, accessed by a flight of steps, there is a hall with galleries and living accommodation with two bathrooms. There is also a wine cellar. The structure is roofed with pantiles.

References

Houses in Wiltshire
Grinding mills in the United Kingdom